The 1989–90 season saw Olympique de Marseille compete in the French Division 1 as reigning champions as well as the 1989–90 Coupe de France and the 1989–90 European Cup.

Overview
In the summer of 1989, Marseille lost many big name players including prolific German striker Klaus Allofs who went to rivals Bordeaux and Franch defender Yvon Le Roux who transferred to PSG. Owner, Bernard Tapie, brought in reinforcements for the double winners though, signing Enzo Francescoli, Carlos Mozer, Jean Tigana, Alain Roche, Manuel Amoros, and Chris Waddle. Of the transfers, Waddle was the most high-profile and the £4.5m Marseille paid Tottenham for Waddle equalled a British record fee and the sixth highest ever paid at that point.

Marseille went into the season as defending French Division 1 champions and successfully defend their crown, winning their seventh French league title overall. Marseille would go deep in both the Coupe de France and the European Cup but lost in the semi-finals in both competitions.

Competitions

Division 1

League table

Results summary

Results by round

Coupe de France

Semi-final

European Cup

First round

Marseille won 4–1 on aggregate.

Second round

Marseille won 3–1 on aggregate.

Quarter-final

Marseille won 4–1 on aggregate.

Semi-final

Marseille 2–2 Benfica on aggregate. Benfica won on away goals.

References

Olympique de Marseille seasons
Olympique de Marseille
French football championship-winning seasons